Panasonic Lumix DMC-TZ18 is a digital camera by Panasonic Lumix from the year 2010. The highest-resolution pictures it records is 14.1 megapixels, through its 24mm Ultra Wide-Angle Leica DC VARIO-ELMAR zoom lens. The range of the focal length of the zoom lens from German company Leica Camera is from a strong wide angle with 24 mm (calculated equivalent to 35 mm film) up to the sixteenfold which is 384 mm, which amounts to a strongly magnifying telephoto lens.

Property
24 mm LEICA DC
16x optical zoom
20x intelligent zoom
iA (Intelligent Auto) mode
HD movies

Gallery

References

External links
DMC-TZ18 on panasonic.it
Panasonic Lumix DMC-TZ18 review

Point-and-shoot cameras
TZ18